My Country: The New Age is a 2019 South Korean television series starring Yang Se-jong, Woo Do-hwan, Kim Seol-hyun and Jang Hyuk. It aired on JTBC and Netflix at 22:50 KST from October 4 to November 23, 2019.

Synopsis
During the transitional period between the end of the Goryeo dynasty and the beginning of the Joseon dynasty, two friends become enemies following a misunderstanding. They try to protect their country, and the people they love, their own way.

Cast

Main
 Yang Se-jong as Seo Hwi
 Moon Woo-jin as young Seo Hwi
A warrior who is the son of a famous swordsman who was framed and put to death. 
 Woo Do-hwan as Nam Seon-ho
 Kim Kang-hoon as young Nam Seon-ho
An ambitious military officer who is the illegitimate son of a high-ranking official.
 Kim Seol-hyun as Han Hee-jae
 Uhm Seo-hyun as young Han Hee-jae
An intelligent and outspoken woman raised by kisaeng in Ihwaru.
 Jang Hyuk as Yi Bang-won
 Ji Eun-sung as young Yi Bang-won
A prince who helps his father overthrow the Goryeo dynasty but is not recognized for his contributions.

Supporting

People in the Palace
 Kim Yeong-cheol as Yi Seong-gye, Yi Bang-won's father
 Ahn Nae-sang as Nam Jeon, Nam Seon-ho's father 
 Park Ye-jin as Queen Sindeok, Yi Seong-gye's second wife
 Lee Hyun-kyun as Yi Bang-gan, Yi Bang-won's elder brother
 Lee Hyo-je as Yi Bang-seok, Yi Seong-gye and Queen Sindeok's second son
 Kim Min-ho as young Yi Bang-seok

People around Seo Hwi
 Yu Oh-seong as Seo Geom, Seo Hwi's father
 Cho Yi-hyun as Seo Yeon, Seo Hwi's sister
 Park So-yi as young Seo Yeon
 Ji Seung-hyun as Park Chi-do, lieutenant who used to work under Seo Geom
 Lee Yoo-joon as Jeong Beom, soldier who fought alongside Seo Hwi in the army
 Shim Wan-joon as Ggae-kku
 In Gyo-jin as Park Moon-bok, soldier who worked as a medic in the army

People in Ihwaru
 Jang Young-nam as Seo Seol, owner of Ihwaru
 Hong Ji-yoon as Hwa-wol, kisaeng who worked in Ihwaru
 Kim Dae-gon as Kang-kae	
 Jang Do-ha as Gyeol, security guard of Ihwaru

Others
 Choi Go as Lee Bang-beon	
 Kim Seo-kyung as Cheon-ga, Lee Bang-won's subordinate
 Kim Jae-young as Tae Ryeong, Lee Bang-won's subordinate
 Kim Dong-won as Hwang Sung-rok, an ex-soldier who is working for Nam Seon-ho

Original soundtrack

Part 1

Part 2

Part 3

Viewership

References

External links
  
 
 
 

JTBC television dramas
2019 South Korean television series debuts
2019 South Korean television series endings
South Korean historical television series
South Korean melodrama television series
South Korean romance television series
Television series set in Goryeo
Television series by Celltrion Entertainment
Korean-language Netflix exclusive international distribution programming